Andé Dona Ndoh (born 22 May 1986) is a Cameroonian football coach and former professional player. During his career, he played as a striker for various French clubs, including Le Havre, Rouen, Luzenac, Chamois Niortais and Nancy.

Career
Ndoh began his career with Unisport de Bafang before moving to Le Havre in the summer of 2005. After spending two years in the reserve team, he had his first taste of professional football on 10 August 2007 when he came on as a substitute in the 1–3 defeat to Libourne.  He then moved on loan to US Luzenac during the 2008–09 season, where he scored 14 goals in 30 league appearances. Ndoh made one further appearance for Le Havre before leaving the club in the summer of 2010 to join Championnat National side FC Rouen. He spent two years with Rouen, scoring 21 goals in 59 league matches during that time. In June 2012 he returned to Luzenac, this time on a permanent basis, along with Rouen teammate Jérôme Hergault. During the 2013–14 season, Ndoh scored 22 league goals, the highest total in the Championnat National. He was also selected as player of the season by the managers in that division. In total, he played 55 league games for Luzenac during a two-year spell, scoring 27 times. 

On 11 June 2014, it was announced that Ndoh had signed a three-year contract with Ligue 2 outfit Chamois Niortais. He remained with Niort until 2019, becoming the club's all-time leading goalscorer with 61 goals in 172 league appearances. After a two-year spell with Nancy at the end of his playing career, Ndoh returned to Niort as an attacking coach under head coach Sébastien Desabre in August 2021.

Career statistics

References

External links

1986 births
Living people
Cameroonian footballers
Cameroonian expatriate footballers
Association football forwards
Le Havre AC players
Luzenac AP players
FC Rouen players
Chamois Niortais F.C. players
AS Nancy Lorraine players
Ligue 2 players
Championnat National players
Championnat National 2 players
Expatriate footballers in France